Leonardas Sauka (5 January 1931 – 17 October 2022) was a Lithuanian folklorist, linguist, translator, and academician of the Lithuanian Academy of Sciences (1996).

Awards
2001: Jonas Basanavičius Award (lt)
2005: 
2009: Baltic Assembly Prize for Science

References

1931 births
2022 deaths
Lithuanian folklorists
Linguists from Lithuania
Lithuanian academicians
People from Telšiai